Panampilly Nagar is a high-end hybrid residential-commercial neighborhood in Kadavanthra region of the city of Kochi, India.  It is a busy upmarket residential area in Kadavanthra region just 1 km east of M.G Road, the center of Kochi city.

From M.G Road, Pallimukku junction, one could move through Sahodaran Ayyappan Road and go over the south bridge take a deviation to the right to reach Panampilly Nagar. There are many by lanes in the place of which Panampilly Avenue is the main avenue close to the South Overbridge.
Panampilly Nagar falls under Kadavanthra Janamythri Police Station and has its own Post office due to high density population apart from the main one at Kadavanthra.

It's an area well connected with Kochi Metro Rail, utilizing Kadavanthra metro station for passenger movements.

History

This once barren and muddy locality with an area demarcated for cultivation, developed into a colony in the 1970s, with LIG (Low income Group) and MIG (Middle Income Group) residential houses coming up.  Giri Nagar adjacent to Panampilly Nagar could be termed as the first colony in Kochi. Though Giri Nagar mostly remains the same, Panampilly Nagar gradually developed into a prestigious residential colony and is home to many apartment complexes as well. Builders such as ABAD Builders, Skyline, Asian Developers,Jains, Mather, RDS, Nagpal Builders, BCG Builders, SMS BUILDERS, URVI Concepts - Architects & Interior , Designers have set up their apartments here. It is in demand as a residential area for its broad roads, clean & green environment and its parks. Panampilly Nagar Welfare Association (PNWA), an association of the residents, is actively involved in beautifying the area. It has various parks specially dedicated to Elderly citizens, Kids, youngsters etc., and the PNWA is enormously promoting the eco friendly- go green theme in the Panampilly Nagar premise. No wonder it attracts anyone and everyone to the place.

It is now gradually turning to be a favoured spot for offices, restaurants and business houses. A number of private companies have set up offices in Panampilly Nagar, mostly in the Main Avenue but they are now slowly expanding to the interior parts as well. The Regional Passport Office, BSNL office & the Malayala Manorama newspaper offices are all located in Panampilly Nagar. Further inside from the main avenue a deviation to the left takes you to Ambikapuram church (Church of Our Lady of Dolorus (1670)) dedicated to Mary of Sorrows and the Corporation crematorium.

Besides Panampilly Nagar Shopping Complex, a number of boutiques, lifestyle stores and restaurants serving Indian as well as such as Chinese and Italian cuisine have come up. The place also offers the services of doctors, advocates, consultants, beauty saloons, fitness centers and so on. Many public sector banks are available which includes Union Bank of India, State Bank of Travancore, Central Bank of India in Kallelil Building, Kadavanthra Jn, and other prominent banks like South Indian Bank, Axis Bank, HDFC Bank at MKS Towers, Kadavanthra are some of them within and in the neighborhood.
 
Panampilly Nagar & Junction was established in 1970s. This locality is fast getting commercialized. The villas on the main road are getting converted to commercial establishments and the people are moving to apartments located within the locality or moving to other suburbs. To cater to the residential community, prominent shopping areas developed all through Panampilly Avenue and S.A Road, Kadavanthra.

See also
Gandhi Nagar, Kochi

References